The Ties That Bind: The River Collection is a box set by American singer-songwriter Bruce Springsteen. Released on December 4, 2015, the collection is an expanded edition of his 1980 album The River, containing 52 tracks on four CDs along with four hours of video on three DVDs or two Blu-ray discs. The first two CDs feature the remastered version of The River and the third CD contains the previously unreleased The Ties That Bind, a single LP originally intended for release in late 1979 before Springsteen expanded it to the final double LP. The fourth CD, The River: Outtakes, spans the entire The River sessions in 1979 and 1980 and contains eleven previously-unreleased outtakes. The fifth disc (DVD or Blu-ray) contains a 60-minute documentary, The Ties That Bind, which was produced and directed by filmmaker Thom Zimny and features an interview with Springsteen as he reflects on writing and recording The River. The film transitions between Springsteen telling the stories behind the music—and illustrating them with solo acoustic guitar performances—interspersed with period concert footage and photos. The remaining disc(s) feature Bruce Springsteen & The E Street Band: The River Tour, Tempe 1980, a new film produced from footage professionally filmed in 1980 using four cameras and recorded in multitrack audio. The film features 23 of 33 songs performed, clocking in at 2 hours, 40 minutes on 2 DVDs (or one Blu-ray), from Springsteen's November 5, 1980, concert at Arizona State University in Tempe, Arizona. Also included is 20 minutes of footage from the late September 1980 River Tour rehearsals held in Lititz, Pennsylvania. The boxed set also includes a 148-page coffee table book featuring 200 rare or previously unseen photos and memorabilia, including a new essay by Mikal Gilmore.

On October 16, 2015, along with the announcement of the boxed set, "Meet Me in the City", one of the eleven unreleased outtakes, was released through Springsteen's website and on iTunes to promote the release of the boxed set. On November 23, 2015, "Party Lights" was released to promote the box set and made available through iTunes. Much like with The Promise, Springsteen recorded new vocals for some of the outtakes in the set.

Springsteen announced details for The River Tour 2016 on December 4, 2015. The tour began in January 2016 and features a full-album performance of The River at every show, as well as other songs from Springsteen's career. As of the end of the U.S. leg on April 25, 2016, "Meet Me in the City" opened all but one show; the song previously made its live debut when Springsteen and the E Street Band performed on the December 19, 2015, episode of Saturday Night Live.

On December 24, 2015, Springsteen released Arizona State University, Tempe 1980, a free download through the Bruce Springsteen Archives at http://live.brucespringsteen.net. The release contained the ten missing songs from the concert video featured in the boxed set.

Track listing
All songs are written by Bruce Springsteen, except where noted.

Unreleased outtakes
Springsteen wrote a large amount of music during album sessions, and even with the 2015 box set, many songs still remain unreleased. Songs such as "Held Up Without a Gun", "Be True", and "Roulette" were featured as B-sides, the first two on the album's singles and the last on a Tunnel of Love single. "Loose Ends", “Roulette”, "Restless Nights", "Where the Bands Are", "Dollhouse", "Living on the Edge of the World", "Take 'em as They Come", "Ricky Wants a Man of Her Own", "I Wanna Be with You", "Mary Lou" were released on the Tracks box set, while "From Small Things (Big Things One Day Come)" was released on The Essential Bruce Springsteen collection in 2003. An alternate version of "Stolen Car" was released on Tracks. During The River sessions, Springsteen also recorded demos of "Jole Blon", "Dedication", "Your Love", and "This Little Girl", in preparation for summer recording sessions he was co-producing for Gary U.S. Bonds. "Jeannie Needs a Shooter" was also given to Warren Zevon, which he re-worked and recorded. None of the demos recorded at Telegraph Hill Studios in Holmdel (the converted barn on Springsteen's property) in 1979 have ever been released, probably because of quality issues ("Night Fire" and "Meet Me In the City", on the outtakes disc, both featured 1979 Power Station backing and 2015 re-recorded vocals). Most can be found on the Lost Masters bootleg collection, released in the 1990s.

"Jeannie Needs a Shooter" 
"Find It Where You Can"
"Break My Heart"
"Out on the Run (Looking for Love)"
"Under the Gun"
"I Don't Wanna Be"
"Chevrolet Deluxe"
"I Will Be the One (aka Slow Fade)"
"Jole Blon"
"Angelyne"
"It's Okay"
"A Thousand Tears (William Davis)"
"Arnie
"Tonight"
"I'm Gonna Treat You Right"
"Dedication"
"Your Love"
"This Little Girl"

Personnel
Credits adapted from the box set liner notes.

CD 3
 Bruce Springsteen – lead vocals, guitar
 Roy Bittan – vocals, piano
 Clarence Clemons – percussion, saxophone
 Danny Federici – organ, keyboards
 Garry Tallent – bass
 Stevie Van Zandt – vocals, guitar
 Max Weinberg – drums
 Bruce Springsteen, Jon Landau, Stevie Van Zandt – production
 Neil Dorfsman, Bob Clearmountain – recording
 Bob Clearmountain – mixing
 Jeff Hendrickson, Garry Rindfuss, Raymond Willhard, James Farber, Bill Scheniman – assistants
 Bob Ludwig – mastering

CD 4
 Bruce Springsteen – lead vocals, guitar
 Roy Bittan – vocals, piano
 Clarence Clemons – percussion, saxophone
 Danny Federici – organ, keyboards
 Garry Tallent – bass
 Stevie Van Zandt – vocals, guitar
 Max Weinberg – drums
 Bruce Springsteen, Jon Landau, Stevie Van Zandt – production
 Neil Dorfsman, Bob Clearmountain – recording 
Toby Scott – additional recording 
Rob Lebret – assistant 
Neil Dorfsman – recording 
Jeff Hendrickson, Garry Rindfuss, Raymond Willhard, James Farber, Bill Scheniman – assistants 
Bob Clearmountain – mixing 
Sergio Ruelas Jr. – assistant 
Ed Thacker – mixing 
Ross Petersen – assistant 
Toby Scott, Chuck Plotkin – mixing 
Dana Bisbee – assistant 
Bob Ludwig – mastering 

DVD 1
 Thom Zimny – director, producer
 Zachary Russo – co-producer
Bruce Springsteen, Jon Landau, Barbara Carr – executive producers
Antonio Rossi – director of photography
Barry Rebo – archival studio and performance footage original producer and director

DVD 2 & 3
 Bruce Springsteen – guitar, lead vocals, harmonica, maracas on "I Wanna Marry You"
 Roy Bittan – keyboards, backing vocals, organ on "I'm a Rocker"
 Clarence Clemons – saxophone, percussion, vocals
 Danny Federici – organ, keyboards on "I'm a Rocker"
 Garry Tallent – bass guitar, backing vocals on "I'm a Rocker"
 Stevie Van Zandt – guitar, vocals
 Max Weinberg – drums
 Thom Zimny – producer, editor
 Bruce Springsteen, Jon Landau, Barbara Carr, George Travis – executive producers
 Barry Rebo – archival performance footage original producer and director
 Zachary Russo – line producer
 Bob Clearmountain – mixing
 Bob Ludwig – mastering

Box set technical personnel
 Toby Scott – recording project supervisor, archival research, retrieval & restoration
 Jan Stabile – project coordinator
 Shari Sutcliffe – musician contractor
 Kevin Buell – guitars and technical services
 Michelle Holme – art direction and design
 Joel Bernstein, David Gahr, Lynn Goldsmith, Peter Howes, Lawrence Kirsch, Jim Marchese, Anastasia Pantsios, Jim Scott, Frank Stefanko, Jimmy Wachtel – photography
 Mikal Gilmore – "American River" (introductory essay)

Charts

Certifications

References

2015 compilation albums
Bruce Springsteen compilation albums
Columbia Records compilation albums